Eberhard Fjord is an arm of Seno Ultima Esperanza in the Patagonian region of Chile. This surface water body was named after Hermann Eberhard, the first European to explore this region. Eberhard used the fjord to find the Cueva del Milodón, where he discovered remains of the extinct Giant sloth; archaeological recovery of evidence of prehistoric man was also found at this cave complex.  Geologically this fjord is within the Magallanes Basin.

See also
Cerro Benitez
Cerro Toro
Turbio River

References
 Ben Box (2004) South American Handbook 2004 Published by Footprint Travel Guides, 1584 pages , 
 C. Michael Hogan, Cueva del Milodon, Megalithic Portal, 13 April 2008

Line notes

Fjords of Chile
Bodies of water of Magallanes Region
Última Esperanza Province